Daniel Hallé (27 September 1614, in Rouen – 14 July 1675, in Paris) was a French painter.

He studied painting in his birthplace and was apprenticed there on 4 November 1631. He produced a Multiplication of the Loaves (1665) and Martyrdom of Saint-Symphorien. He was the father of the painter Claude Guy Hallé and a grandfather of the painter Noël Hallé.

Works
 Christ in the Tomb, musée Greuze, Tournus
 The Nativity, musée des beaux-arts de Rouen

References

1614 births
1675 deaths
Artists from Rouen
French Baroque painters